The WePlay AniMajor Dota 2 tournament was organized by Valve, held and operated by the WePlay Esports media holding company. This was the first anime-themed Dota 2 event.

History
On May 16, WePlay Esports announced that it would be hosting the second Dota 2 Major of the 2021 DPC season in the capital of Ukraine — Kyiv.
Titled "WePlay AniMajor," the coveted tournament featured 18 of the best Dota 2 teams from around the world competing from June 2 to 13, 2021, for a total prize pool of $500,000 and the associated 2,700 Dota Pro Circuit (DPC) points.

Tournament format

The WePlay AniMajor started with the Wild Card Stage which ran from June 2 to 3. Six teams fought in a single round-robin series at best-of-two. Only the top two teams moved to the next stage while the rest got eliminated.

Next was the Group stage which took place on June 4–7. Here, eight teams participated in a single round-robin at Bo2 as well. The top two teams advanced to the Upper Bracket of the Playoffs, while the next four teams went to the Lower Bracket. The bottom two teams got eliminated.

The Playoffs started on June 9 and were played in double-elimination best-of-three series. The Grand Final, were a best-of-five.

Participants

Playoffs

Group stage

Wild Card

Winners

“Unfortunately, the epidemiological situation in Kyiv does not allow us to receive guests: the tournament will be closed to spectators, as the players and employees’ safety is our highest priority,” said WePlay Esports.

WePlay AniMajor was the final opportunity for many teams in the circuit to earn the all-important DPC points to go towards securing a direct invite to The International 10 (TI10) with a US$40 million prize pool. Upon participation in WePlay AniMajor, Team Spirit obtained enough DPC points to qualify for TI10, which they won, earning $18.2 million.

References

External links
 Official website

 
Recurring sporting events established in 2021